Pandit Kaivalya Kumar Gurav is a third generation singer from the Kirana Gharana (singing style) of Indian classical music.

Early life
Gurav belongs to a family of musicians. His grandfather, Pt. Ganapatrao Gurav, was a disciple of Bhaskar Buva Bhakle, the first in line from Ustad Abdul Karim Khan who was the founder of the Kirana Gharana. Training under his grandfather, Pt Sangameshwar Gurav was known for singing in true Kirana Gharana tradition. His father groomed the young Gurav in vocal skills who then started his musical career with Marathi Natyasangeet and then entered to Khayal singing.

Career
Kaivalya has several albums to his credit. He is the youngest Hindustani Classical vocalist to get a top grade by All India Radio and Doordarshan Gurav has performed in the United States, the United Kingdom, France, Canada, Singapore, Australia, Dubai, Muscat, and Qatar.

References

20th-century Indian male classical singers
Living people
Savitribai Phule Pune University alumni
Hindustani singers
People from Dharwad
Kirana gharana
Singers from Karnataka
Year of birth missing (living people)
21st-century Indian male classical singers